The 1916 Army Cadets football team represented the United States Military Academy in the 1916 college football season. In their fourth season under head coach Charles Dudley Daly, the Cadets compiled a 9–0 record and outscored all opponents by a combined total of 235 to 36.  In the annual Army–Navy Game, the Cadets defeated the Midshipmen 15 to 7.  The Cadets also defeated Notre Dame by a score of 30 to 10 and Villanova by a 69 to 7 score. The 1916 Army team was selected retroactively as the 1916 national champion by Parke H. Davis.

Fullback Elmer Oliphant from the 1916 Army team was a consensus first-team All-American and was later inducted into the College Football Hall of Fame in 1955. Center John McEwan received second-team honors from Walter Camp, the United Press, the International News Service, and Walter Eckersall.

Schedule

References

Army
Army Black Knights football seasons
College football undefeated seasons
College football national champions
Army Cadets football